Eufriesea flaviventris is a species of bee in the family Apidae, tribe Euglossini (orchid bees).

References

flav
Hymenoptera of South America
Hymenoptera of Brazil
Insects described in 1964
Orchid pollinators